Dagmar Urbancová is a former Czech football defender. She played for DFC Compex Otrokovice in the Czech First Division and Bayern Munich in the German Bundesliga.

She was a member of the Czech national team.

References

1983 births
Living people
Czech women's footballers
Czech expatriate women's footballers
Czech Republic women's international footballers
Expatriate women's footballers in Germany
People from Uherské Hradiště
FC Bayern Munich (women) players
1. FC Slovácko players
Czech expatriate sportspeople in Germany
Women's association football defenders
Frauen-Bundesliga players
Sportspeople from the Zlín Region